Chlidichthys chagosensis, the Chagos dottyback, is a species of fish in the family Pseudochromidae.

Description

Distribution and habitat
Chlidichthys chagosensis is found only in the Western Indian Ocean from the Chagos Archipelago.

References

Pseudoplesiopinae
Taxa named by Anthony C. Gill
Taxa named by Alasdair James Edwards
Fish described in 2004